Mark Clifford Funderburk (born May 16, 1957 in Charlotte, North Carolina) is a retired Major League Baseball outfielder and designated hitter. He played during two seasons at the major league level for the Minnesota Twins. He was drafted by the Twins in the 16th round of the 1976 amateur entry draft. Funderburk played his first professional season with their Rookie League Elizabethton Twins in 1976, and his last with their Double-A Orlando Twins in 1987.
He also played for the Venezuelan League with Navegantes del Magallanes. He became the first player to hit two home runs in the same inning in the LVBP on November 16, 1985 against Leones del Caracas.

References

External links
, or Retrosheet
Pura Pelota (Venezuelan Winter League)
 https://elfildeo.com/lvbp/beisbol-venezolano-caracas-magallanes-mike-funderbuk/146072/2020/

1957 births
Living people
African-American baseball players
American expatriate baseball players in Mexico
Baseball players from Charlotte, North Carolina
Elizabethton Twins players
American expatriate baseball players in Italy
Louisburg Hurricanes baseball players
Major League Baseball designated hitters
Major League Baseball left fielders
Minnesota Twins players
Navegantes del Magallanes players
American expatriate baseball players in Venezuela
Omaha Royals players
Orlando Twins players
Rimini Baseball Club players
Tigres del México players
Toledo Mud Hens players
Visalia Oaks players
Wisconsin Rapids Twins players
21st-century African-American people
20th-century African-American sportspeople